Jess Dandy (November 9, 1871 in Rochester, New York – April 15, 1923 in Brookline, Massachusetts) was an American actor during the silent movie era in Hollywood. His real name was Jesse A. Danzig.  While working at Keystone Studios in 1914, Dandy appeared in nine of Charlie Chaplin's comedy shorts.

Selected filmography
 His Favourite Pastime (1914)
 The New Janitor as Bank president (1914)
 The Star Boarder (1914)
 The Property Man (1914)
 The Face on the Bar Room Floor (1914)
 His New Profession (1914)
 The Rounders (1914)
 The Masquerader (1914)
 Dough and Dynamite (1914)
 Killing Horace
 Hello, Mabel
 Fatty Again
 Leading Lizzie Astray

External links

 
 

 Jess Dandy

1871 births
1923 deaths
Burials at Woodlawn Cemetery (Bronx, New York)